The , commonly known as  is an urban automated guideway transit (AGT) system in Kobe, Japan, operated by Kobe New Transit. Opened in 1981, the Port Liner was the world's first driverless urban transit system, more than two years ahead of the VAL system used on the Lille Metro, which opened in 1983.

The initial system linked Sannomiya Station, Kobe's main transit hub, to the man-made Port Island, covering a distance of 6.4 km with 9 stations. On February 2, 2006, the line was extended by 4.3 km to the new Kobe Airport, built on an artificial island near Port Island.

Route 
As the map indicates, the present system consists of one straight line, originating at Sannomiya Station and terminating at Kobe Airport Station, and a loop attached to the middle of the straight line. The stations on the former are numbered with prefix "P" and on the latter (except those shared with the former) are with prefix "PL".

Originally, before the 2006 extension to the airport, the loop section was single track and operated only counter-clockwise trains. Presently the main section between Sannomiya and the airport is entirely double track, but the remaining of the loop has not been rebuilt so that the three stations with PL prefix still serve only one way.

Stations 
All stations are located in Chūō-ku, Kobe. 

Minatojima Station, Iryō Center Station and K Computer Mae Stations were renamed on July 1, 2011, from Shimin Byōin Mae Station, Sentan Iryō Center Mae Station and Port Island Minami Station respectively.

Rolling stock 
Kobe New Transit 2020 series (since 2016)
Kobe New Transit 2000 series (since 2006)
Kobe New Transit 8000 series (from 1981 until 2009)

See also 
Rokkō Island Line
Airport rail link

References

External links

 Official site  
 English part of official site

People mover systems in Japan
Rail transport in Hyōgo Prefecture
Transport in Kobe
Airport rail links in Japan
Railway lines opened in 1981
1981 establishments in Japan